is a large thermal power station in Shinagawa, Tokyo, Japan. The power station generates electricity utilizing three units of 350 MW, which run on crude oil, with a total installed capacity of 1,050 MW. The first unit went online in August 1971, followed by Unit 2 in February 1972, and Unit 3 in December 1973. The facility is located on a  site.

See also 

 Energy in Japan
 List of power stations in Japan

References 

Buildings and structures in Tokyo
Oil-fired power stations in Japan
Tokyo Electric Power Company
Shinagawa
1971 establishments in Japan
Energy infrastructure completed in 1971